Pachyphragma is a genus of flowering plants belonging to the family Brassicaceae.

Its native range is Turkey to Caucasus.

Species
Species:
 Pachyphragma macrophyllum (Hoffm.) N.Busch

References

Brassicaceae
Brassicaceae genera